Marianne Wahlberg (1917-2005) was a Swedish politician (Liberals (Sweden)). 

She was MP of the Parliament of Sweden in 1979–1982. 

She served as Deputy Minister of Budget in 1978–1979.

References

1917 births
2005 deaths
20th-century Swedish politicians
20th-century Swedish women politicians
Women members of the Riksdag
Women government ministers of Sweden